Rutgers University–New Brunswick is one of three regional campuses of Rutgers University, a public land-grant research university consisting of four campuses in New Jersey. It is located in New Brunswick and Piscataway. It is the oldest campus of the university, the others being in Camden and Newark. The campus is composed of several smaller campuses: College Avenue, Busch, Livingston, Cook, and Douglass, the latter two sometimes referred to as "Cook/Douglass", as they are adjacent to each other. Rutgers–New Brunswick also includes several buildings in downtown New Brunswick. It is classified among "R1: Doctoral Universities – Very high research activity". The New Brunswick campuses include 19 undergraduate, graduate, and professional schools. The New Brunswick campus is also known as the birthplace of college football.

History

Campuses
Each of the five campuses hosts its own student center, libraries, commercial venues, dining halls, and residence buildings. However, the physical atmosphere of each campus differs, and may also host specific academic departments, facilities, and schools.

Busch: Busch Campus is located entirely within Piscataway Township, New Jersey. The campus is named after Charles L. Busch (1902–1971), a wealthy benefactor, who unexpectedly donated $10 million to the university for biological research at his death in 1971. The campus was formerly known as "University Heights Campus" and the land was donated to the university by the state in the 1930s. The land was formerly a country club and the original golf course still exists on the campus. The campus is home to the SHI Stadium, and provides a high-tech and suburban atmosphere focusing on academic areas primarily related to the natural sciences; Physics, Engineering, Mathematics & Statistics, Pharmacy, Chemistry, Geology, Biology and Psychology. The Rutgers Medical School was also built on this campus in 1970 but a year later was separated by the State to create the College of Medicine and Dentistry of New Jersey (now UMDNJ). The two universities continue to share the land and facilities on the campus in a slightly irregular arrangement. The medical school was returned to Rutgers in 2014.
College Avenue: this campus includes the historic seat of the university, a block known as Old Queens campus. It is within walking distance of shops, restaurants, and theaters in downtown New Brunswick, as well as the NJ Transit train station which provides easy access to New York and Philadelphia. The New Brunswick NJ Transit station also provides Amtrak service, with connections to Washington, D.C. and other major cities. Many classes are taught in the area around Voorhees Mall.
Cook: farms, gardens, and research centers are found on the George H. Cook Campus, including the School of Environmental and Biological Sciences (formerly Cook College), the Institute of Marine and Coastal Sciences, Rutgers Gardens, and the Center for Advanced Food Technology. It is also home to community improvement programs, such as Rutgers Against Hunger, the New Brunswick Community Farmer's Market and statewide programs under the Rutgers Cooperative Extension.

Douglass: adjacent to New Brunswick's second ward, it shares many of its open fields with Cook, as they share a campus. The school has many stately buildings with traditional architecture. Douglass Campus is home to the Douglass Residential College for women and has four women's-only housing options. It was previously the home of the degree granting Douglass College, a liberal arts college for women.
Livingston: Livingston Campus is home to many of the social science departments and the Rutgers Business School. The Rutgers Athletic Center (commonly known as "the RAC"), the student-founded Livingston Theater, and the Rutgers Ecological Preserve are also found here. The campus is situated in Piscataway Township although it extends into parts of Edison Township and Highland Park. Livingston Campus was recently expanded and renovated.

Facilities

 Transportation: the campus bus and shuttle system is a service provided as a means to travel between campuses. Nine weekday bus lines between campuses exist due to the sheer passenger volume and distances involved. Class times are staggered across campuses to accommodate for travel times, with most students allotted 40 minuets of travel time for the Fall 2021 semester.
Computing centers: student accessible computers are mainly concentrated within computer labs. Rutgers has many computing centers to serve the university community.
Meals: the dining services claim to be the third largest student dining operation in the US, serving 4.5 million meals annually. There are four student dining facilities which also provide catering for over 5000 University events yearly. The dining halls on Busch, College Avenue, and Livingston campuses also have faculty dining rooms. Dining halls provide various "event nights" including a midnight breakfast during exams week and King Neptune Night. All student centers also provide food services, mostly "fast food" style.

Food Pantry 
The Food Pantry started in 2016 located in the College Ave student center. It is offered to any Rutgers students who shows a valid RUID card. The food pantry offers food for people who may not be able to afford it or for any other reason. They get their food from many donations. Their hours are Tuesday-Friday 12 p.m. – 4 p.m. with the exception of Thursday being their Mobile food pantry located on Busch, Livingston, and Douglass. 

 Health centers: Rutgers has 3 health centers/pharmacies which provide primary care to Rutgers students. The RUHS nurse line is available at no charge to Rutgers University students when the Health Centers are closed. Hurtado Health Center is located on the College Avenue campus, and the Busch-Livingston Health Center shares a parking lot with the RAC on the Livingston Campus.
Museums: the Jane Voorhees Zimmerli Art Museum is located in Voorhees Mall of the College Avenue campus. It was founded in 1966 and later named after Jane Voorhees Zimmerli who was the mother of philanthropist Alan Voorhees. The Geology Museum is also located on college Avenue Campus. The Mason Gross Galleries are located downtown at Civic Square.

Academics

Residence life
Residence halls provide many facilities for students. With over 15,000 resident students, 5 different campuses each with its own identity, 58 residence halls, 4 dining halls and 30-plus food courts/cafés, students can find everything they need right on campus. Despite some over-crowding, students wishing to live on-campus are usually accommodated, with a lottery system for non-incoming freshmen determining the order in which students choose their preferred housing (With the exception of Demarest Hall, which exempts students from the lottery system as long as they are contracted to special interest sections, and BEST (Busch Engineering, Science, and Technology) Hall, which is open only to students from SAS, SOE, and Pharmacy, and exempts them from the lottery if they got into the hall as a freshman). Single, double, and triple-occupancy rooms (in traditional residence halls), apartments housing four students each, and suites housing six (or four, as in BEST Hall) students each are available. Rooms and apartments are single-sex, with the exception of married graduate student housing, which also permit children of students. The other exceptions to this rule are the Livingston Apartments, Demarest Hall, and Rainbow Perspective Special Interest Rooms in New Gibbons. (These, however require special applications to be made) Most floors and buildings are co-ed, with the exception of Douglass Residential College facilities for women. Rooms usually contain beds, desks, chairs, dressers, and a closet for each student. Cable/internet access are also provided, but due to the widespread use of mobile phones, traditional land-line phone service is no longer provided in the halls. Many residence halls include laundries, main lounges with TVs, foosball and ping-pong, floor lounges with sofas, study tables, and kitchenettes, study lounges, and vending machines. Every floor or house has a resident assistant, an upper class student mentor who has received special training and is responsible for handling a number of tasks, such as planning programs and events, monitoring for safety, and documenting policy and procedure violations.

In the past, due to overcrowding, Rutgers has rented rooms for students in the Franklin Township Crowne Plaza. Shuttle buses provided transportation to campus for these students.

Residence halls by campus:
 Busch Campus: BAMM Residence Halls: Barr, Allen, Mattia, Metzger. Suites: Crosby, Judson, McCormick, Morrow, Thomas, Winkler, BEST Hall (North, East, and West). Apartments: Nichols, Richardson, Silvers, Marvin. Graduate-only Apartments: Buell, Johnson.
 College Avenue Campus: Bishop Beach Residence Halls: Brett, Demarest, Mettler, Tinsley, Stonier. Bishop Quad Residence Halls: Clothier, Hegeman, Leupp, Pell, Wessels. River Dorms: Campbell, Frelinghuysen, Hardenbergh. Apartments: University Center, Sojourner Truth Apartments (formerly College Avenue Apartments). Invite-only: Honors College.
 Cook Campus: Residence Halls: Helyar House, Lippincott, Nicholas, Perry, Voorhees. Apartments: Newell, Starkey.
 Douglass Campus: Residence Halls: Bunting-Cobb, Katzenbach, Jameson (A-B-C-D-G), New Gibbons, Woodbury. Apartments: Henderson.
 Livingston Campus: Residence Halls: Lynton Towers (North and South), The Quads (1-2-3). Apartments: Livingston Apartments (A-B-C).

Other Halls: Davidson (Busch: Closed in 2016), Ford (College Avenue: Closed 2013), Corwin (Cook: Closed 2013), Old Gibbons (Douglass: Closed 2020), Rockoff (Downtown: Now off-campus).

Graduate family housing
Three complexes provide graduate family housing. They are Johnson Apartments, Marvin Apartments, and Nichols Apartments. All three apartment facilities are located in Piscataway Township on Busch Campus.

In 1966 Johnson was built. In 1973 Marvin was built. Nichols was constructed in 1975.

Student life

Newspapers
The Daily Targum, dating back to 1869, is the largest student paper at Rutgers, and independent, boasting a circulation of 15,000. It features international, national, local and university news, as well as editorials, columns, comics, classifieds and sports. In fall of 2019, the organization lost a student referendum vote to keep a minimal funding cost on students' term bills with an opt-out option. Now, this opt-out cost has since been removed.
The Medium is a weekly student run publication which satirizes events both local to the university and national.
The Green Print covers general news as well as environmental issues.
The Rutgers Review is the bi-monthly alternative arts and culture magazine.
The Rutgers Centurion was a monthly conservative magazine.
The Caellian is the Progressive paper of Douglass Residential College, and features artistic submissions and LGBT issues.
The BVCL (Black Voice Carte Latina) is the paper of the black / Hispanic student body.

Greek life

The campus is home to over 80 fraternities and sororities, including African-American, Latino/a, multicultural and Asian-interest. Several organizations maintain houses for their chapters in the area of Union Street (known locally as "Frat Row"), adjacent to the College Avenue Campus. Greek organizations are governed by the Office of Fraternity and Sorority Affairs.

Traditions

The Grease Trucks were a group of truck-based food vendors located on the College Avenue Campus. They serve traditional grill fare, Middle-Eastern specialties, and are especially well known for serving "Fat Sandwiches", a sub roll containing various ingredients such as cheesesteak, burgers, pork roll, chicken fingers, French fries, mozzarella sticks, eggs, bacon, gyro meat, marinara sauce, etc. The Rutgers Grease Trucks were located in a designated lot for nearly two decades until August 2013. Truck owners were forced to relocate due to the construction of an $84 million student apartment complex. Three trucks remain on the College Avenue Campus, while the remaining two were moved to the Cook/Douglass Campus. Now, there is a store opening in the new area on College Avenue called "The Yard".

The Dance Marathon is a student-run organization that consists of a year-long series of fundraisers and culminates with the annual Marathon on April 5–6 in the College Avenue Gym. At the Marathon over 400 dancers pledge to raise funds and remain standing for 32 hours without sleeping. The 'Dancers', along with over 500 volunteers and countless visitors, are entertained by live bands, comedians, prize giveaways, games, sports, a mechanical bull, computer and internet access, various theme hours and much more. Rutgers has held this tradition since 1999 and to date has raised in excess of $1.3 million for the Embrace Kids Foundation. In the seventies the Dance Marathon raised funds for the American Cancer Society. In the Eighties it was the Rutger Cancer Research Association.

RutgersFest was a day-long cultural event staged variously on either Livingston Campus or Busch Campus. It was designed to promote college spirit through student organization participation with activities and entertainment throughout the day, culminating with a free concert and fireworks at night. The event was free to all students and guests and was funded as part of an elected programming fee paid by all students as part tuition. Past musical guests have included: Kanye West, Everclear, Sugar Ray, Guster, Goldfinger, Ludacris, Reel Big Fish, Method Man and Redman, Fuel, Third Eye Blind, Hawthorne Heights, NAS, SR-71, Ok Go, N.E.R.D, Pitbull, and more. The event would feature carnival attractions such as bungee bull, bouncy boxing, moon walk, electronic basketball, a recording studio and more. Attendance for the annual event was about 40,000–50,000, topping out at an estimated 65,000 in 2004 at the event which featured Kanye West and Sugar Ray The event was staged by the Rutgers University Programming Association (RUPA), formerly known as the Rutgers College Programming Committee (RCPC), as a year-end celebration before the start of the final examination period.

During its final year in 2011, the festival was held on Busch Campus. Invited musical guests included Yelawolf, Pitbull, and 3OH!3. Several violent incidents that year lead to the indefinite cancellation of the event. President Richard McCormick, in a letter to the Rutgers community, commented: "The problems that occur following RutgersFest have grown beyond our capacity to manage them, and the only responsible course of action is to cancel the event."

Bus system

The size of the campus requires the use of mass transit to get students around to the different residential campuses. There are 10 main buses. The LX runs from Livingston to College Avenue, REXL runs from Livingston to Cook-Douglass, B and B-He run from Livingston to Busch, A and H run from College Avenue to Busch, REXB runs from Busch to Cook-Douglass, F and EE run from College Avenue to Cook-Douglass and C is the Busch commuter shuttle. Bus Service is currently provided by First Transit and runs all year including breaks and weekends. On the weekends, there are different buses and routes, and they are called weekend buses. There are only two routes on the weekends, the "Weekend 1" route and the "Weekend 2" route. When the campus transit system is not in service, a smaller point-to-point shuttle called the Knight Mover is provided for student transportation.

Currently, there are bike lanes and bus lanes separately at College Avenue Campus to improve the traffic.

Public safety

According to a New Brunswick Crime Rate Report,"the city's violent crime rate for New Brunswick in 2009 was higher than the national violent crime rate average by 75.98% and the city property crime rate in New Brunswick was higher than the national property crime rate average by 12.75%. In 2009 the city violent crime rate in New Brunswick was higher than the violent crime rate in New Jersey by 142.64% and the city property crime rate in New Brunswick was higher than the property crime rate in New Jersey by 64.59%". Projected Crime Incidents for 2012, include 184 incidents for Aggravated Assault, 3 incidents for Arson, 523 incidents for Burglary, 25 incidents for Forcible Rape, 865 incidents for Larceny and Theft, 73 incidents for Motor Vehicle Theft, 5 incidents for Murder and Manslaughter, 132 incidents for Robbery, with 1,791 total incidents including 1,464 for Property Crime and 347 for Violent Crime.

In March 2012, the Daily Targum published an article, City Activists Seek Answers to Street Violence, regarding the increase in street violence in New Brunswick, "In an attempt to stop local street violence, residents are teaming up with New Brunswick authorities to make the city streets safer through various efforts. David Harris, executive director of the Greater New Brunswick Daycare Council, said community leaders and activists in New Brunswick are exploring different ways to combat criminal activity".

However, the crime rate in New Brunswick for 2012 is expected to be lower than in 2009. Based on data from 11 years, New Brunswick crime statistics report an overall downward trend in crime. But, compared to statistics from previous years, while property crime is decreasing, violent crime is increasing.

Athletic heritage

Rutgers University is referred to as The Birthplace of College Football as the first intercollegiate football game was held on College Field between Rutgers and Princeton on November 6, 1869, on a plot of ground behind where the present-day College Avenue Gymnasium now stands. Rutgers won the game, by the score of 6 to Princeton's 4.

In 1864, rowing became the first organized sport at Rutgers. Six mile races were held on the Raritan River among six-oared boats. In 1870, Rutgers held its first intercollegiate competition against the Lawrence Scientific School of Harvard. During the following century, Rutgers built a strong men's crew program consisting of both heavyweight and lightweight teams. A women's crew team was added in 1974. In the fall of 2007, men's heavyweight and lightweight crew, along with men's swimming and diving, men's tennis, and men's and women's fencing were cut as NCAA Division I sports by the university administration. The university claimed these changes were due to budget cuts, while others said it was a politically motivated move used to protest funding changes by the state. The university currently has no plans to restore these sports.

See also

List of American state universities

Footnotes

External links

Rutgers–New Brunswick Scarlet Knights website

Rutgers University-
Geography of Middlesex County, New Jersey
Buildings and structures in New Brunswick, New Jersey
Tourist attractions in New Brunswick, New Jersey
Universities and colleges in Middlesex County, New Jersey
Public universities and colleges in New Jersey